Murdock M. McLeod (c. 1847 - December 1895) was a lawyer who served as a city clerk and state legislator in Mississippi. A Republican, he  served as the 21st Secretary of State of Mississippi from October to November 1873. He is listed as one of several "Negro" Mississippi Secretary of State officeholders who served during the Reconstruction era.

Biography 
Murdock M. McLeod was born circa 1847 in Ohio. He served as the city clerk of Jackson, Mississippi. On October 20, 1873, McLeod was appointed Secretary of State of Mississippi by Mississippi governor Ridgley C. Powers. McLeod served until he resigned on November 13, 1873. From 1884 to 1886, he represented Hinds County in the Mississippi House of Representatives. McLeod died in December 1895 in Aberdeen, Mississippi.

References 

1840s births
1895 deaths
African-American politicians during the Reconstruction Era
Republican Party members of the Mississippi House of Representatives
Mississippi lawyers
Secretaries of State of Mississippi
African-American state legislators in Mississippi